Peter Gunby (20 November 1934 – 26 March 2022) was an English professional football player and coach.

Career
Born in Leeds, Gunby played as a right half for Leeds UYMI, Leeds United, Bradford City and Harrogate Town. For Bradford City he made three appearances in the Football League.

He managed Harrogate Town in the 1970s. After working as an electrician, he later worked as a coach at Huddersfield Town and Leeds United, and also had two short spells as caretaker manager of Leeds in 1985 and 1988. By September 2007 he had been awarded an OBE.

Gunby died on 26 March 2022, aged 87.

Sources

References

1934 births
2022 deaths
English footballers
Footballers from Leeds
Association football wing halves
English Football League players
Leeds United F.C. players
Bradford City A.F.C. players
Harrogate Town A.F.C. players
English football managers
Harrogate Town A.F.C. managers
Leeds United F.C. managers
Leeds United F.C. non-playing staff
Huddersfield Town A.F.C. non-playing staff